Raúl Alvin "Nalvin" Mendoza Argüello (born 27 July 1984) is a Mexican former footballer who last played for Coatepeque.

Mendoza was trained in the Club America youth system and made his debut during the Clausura 2005 season against Atlante. Despite playing infrequently, Mendoza won his first championship. Mendoza has played 42 games for 1680 minutes.

Mendoza also won the championship in the Primera A with San Luis, Club America's brother team.

He was also part of the Mexico U-20 squad at the 2003 FIFA World Youth Championship held in the United Arab Emirates. He played in all 3 group games, as Mexico exited in the first round.

External links
 
 
 
 

1984 births
Living people
Footballers from Mexico City
San Luis F.C. players
Club América footballers
C.D. Veracruz footballers
Querétaro F.C. footballers
Mexico under-20 international footballers
Association football defenders
Mexican footballers